The Proposal is a reality dating series that airs on ABC and premiered on June 18, 2018. The show is hosted by Jesse Palmer, a former NFL quarterback and the season 5 Bachelor.

A bachelor or bachelorette is hidden from view, and 10 contestants of the opposite binary gender must introduce themselves and answer questions posed by the bachelor or bachelorette. Contestants are eliminated until the end of the hour, when the bachelor or bachelorette can choose to propose to one of the final two candidates.

On August 5, 2019, the series was cancelled after one season.

An Australian adaptation of the program aired on the Seven Network from August to October 2019.

Episodes

Controversy
On June 22, 2018, a woman named Erica Denae Meshke accused contestant Michael J. Friday of luring her for sexual assault in November 2017. As a result, ABC decided to pull the episode that features Friday from airing. On the show, he was eliminated after round 1.

Reception
The series holds a score of 25 on Metacritic based on 4 reviews. Newsday gave the show 2 out of 4 stars. Tierney Bricker of E! Online says the show is like "The Bachelor on steroids."

International editions

Australia 

An Australian version of the program was commissioned by the Seven Network, hosted by Luke Jacobz. 8 episodes were produced. It premiered on August 27, 2019 at 8:30pm to low ratings of just 329,000 viewers. After three episodes and continuing low ratings, it was bumped to 9:30pm. The final episode aired on October 15 to just 120,000 overnight viewers.

Seven has not stated whether the show will return for a second season, with any mention of the program absent during their Upfronts 2020 program line-up announcement.

References

External links

The Proposal on  Internet Movie Database
The Proposal on TV Guide
The Proposal 

2010s American game shows
2010s American reality television series
2018 American television series debuts
2018 American television series endings
American Broadcasting Company original programming
American dating and relationship reality television series
English-language television shows
Television series by Warner Horizon Television